Hannah Bluma Sultz (born in Vilna) was a Lithuanian Hebrew poet. She was among the few women to publish literary works during the Haskalah period.

Her poems include Ha-Maḥaze ('The Play', 1882), a 54-stanza allegory of the power of wealth, and Gei Ḥizayon ('The Valley of Revelation', 1883), a description of a prophetic Zionist vision, published as special additions to the 10th and 11th volumes of Ha-Shaḥar, respectively.

Bibliography

References

19th-century Lithuanian women writers
19th-century women writers from the Russian Empire
Hebrew-language poets
Jewish writers from the Russian Empire
People of the Haskalah